Epithelial stromal interaction 1 is a protein that in humans is encoded by the EPSTI1 gene.

Function

The protein encoded by this gene has been shown to promote tumor invasion and metastasis in some invasive cancer cells when overexpressed. Expression of this gene has been shown to be upregulated by direct binding of the Kruppel like factor 8 protein to promoter sequences. The translated protein interacts with the amino terminal region of the valosin containing protein gene product, resulting in the nuclear translocation of the nuclear factor kappa B subunit 1 gene product, and activation of target genes. Overexpression of this gene has been observed in some breast cancers and in some individuals with systemic lupus erythematosus (SLE).

References

Further reading